The Supreme Court of the Republic of Belarus is the highest-tier court inside of Belarus and acts as the final "court of review." Its general tasks include the oversight of lower-tier courts and can render justice in areas of general civil and criminal law. Unlike the United States Supreme Court, constitutional issues are not sent to the Belarusian Supreme Court, but are sent to a separate court called the Constitutional Court. The judges to the Supreme Court are appointed by the president.

History
On 1 January 2014 the Supreme Economic Court of Belarus merged with the Supreme Court.

References

External links
Court website

Government of Belarus
Law of Belarus
Belarus
Courts and tribunals established in 1991
1991 establishments in Belarus